Serine (or cysteine) peptidase inhibitor, clade A, member 3F is a protein that in the mouse is encoded by the Serpina3f gene.

References

Further reading 

Genes on human chromosome 12